Leslie Thomas Clayton Stevenson (born 1959) has been the Church of Ireland Archdeacon of Meath and Kildare since 2009.

Stevenson was educated  at Trinity College, Dublin; and ordained in 1984.

He served at 
 Dundela (Curate)
 Kilmore and Inch (Incumbent)
 Donaghadee (Incumbent)
 Portarlington (Incumbent)

References

1959 births
Archdeacons of Meath and Kildare
Alumni of Trinity College Dublin
Living people